"Gimme That" is a song written by Scott Storch and Sean Garrett and recorded by American singer Chris Brown for his eponymous debut album. The official remix, featuring American rapper Lil Wayne, was released as the third single from the album in April 2006 and peaked at number 15 on the Billboard Hot 100 chart.

Song information
In interviews from 2006, Brown considered choosing the song as the second single from his debut album, but the song "Yo (Excuse Me Miss)" was chosen as the single instead. Along with that, "Gimme That" was also featured at the end of the "Yo (Excuse Me Miss)" music video.

The single version features rapper Lil Wayne, who has since been a featured rapper on each of Brown's future albums.

Music video
The music video was directed by Erik White, who also directed the videos for "Run It!" and "Yo (Excuse Me Miss)". It was inspired by the Michael Jackson videos "Smooth Criminal" and "You Rock My World" videos. It was shot at the Los Angeles Union Station in downtown Los Angeles.

The music video begins with Brown walking into the station. After catching the eye of a girl near him, he falls asleep listening to "Poppin'" on his Sony Walkman Bean. In his dream, the station transforms into a 1920s Harlem setting, with him a business man and the girl a rich snobby woman. At the end, Brown and the girl almost kiss but he is woken up by Lil Wayne.

Chart performance
Gimme That debuted at number 80 on the US Billboard Hot 100 on April 11, 2006, and climbed the charts to peak at number 15 on June 6, 2006. On November 22, 2017, the single was certified platinum by the Recording Industry Association of America (RIAA) for sales of over a million copies in the United States.

Track listing
Europe CD single
 "Gimme That" (remix) (featuring Lil Wayne) – 3:56
 "Gimme That" – 3:07

Credits and personnel
 Vocals: Chris Brown and Dwayne Carter
 Writers: Dwayne Carter, Scott Storch and Sean Garrett
 Mastered by: Herb Powers Jr
 Assistant engineer: Patrick Magee
 Guitar: Aaron Fishbein
 Mixed by: Brian Stanley and Val Braithwaite (assistant)
 Photography: Clay Patrick McBride
 Recorded by: Charles McCrorey, Carlos Paucar, Conrad Golding and Wayne Allison

Charts

Weekly charts

Year-end charts

Certifications

References

2005 songs
2006 singles
Chris Brown songs
Lil Wayne songs
Song recordings produced by Scott Storch
Songs written by Scott Storch
Songs written by Lil Wayne
Songs written by Sean Garrett
Music videos directed by Erik White